Illumination is the fourth studio album by the Scottish band The Pastels, originally released via Domino Recording Company in 1997. The album shows the group honing in on a warmer, gentler and more subdued sound compared to their previous work. It is their last studio album to feature longtime member Annabel "Aggi" Wright as a full member before she left to concentrate on her career as an illustrator in 2000. Whilst The Pastels continued to release music, Illumination would be their last proper studio album for 16 years, until the release of Slow Summits in 2013.

Reception
Stephen Thomas Erlewine of AllMusic gave the album 3.5 stars out of 5, saying, "Scaling back the snappy production and crisp guitars of their earlier releases, the group crafts a collection of subdued, lovely melodies in the vein of the Velvet Underground's third album." He added, "While the Pastels lack Lou Reed's lyricism or the Velvets' assured experimentalism, the hushed ambience and sighing melodies of Illumination make it a charming listen." Angela Lewis of The Independent said, "The patron saints of Scottish indie pop retain their love of gently poignant lyrics and mellow guitar rustlings with their umpteenth album in 10 years; but now there's a new electronic edge, adding curiosity value."

Track listing

Personnel
Credits adapted from liner notes.
 Stephen Pastel – guitar, vocals, keyboards
 Aggi Wright – bass guitar, vocals, melodica
 Katrina Mitchell – drums, vocals, keyboards, melodica, violin, arrangement
 Jonathan Kilgour – guitar
 Gerard Love – guitar
 Norman Blake – guitar, vocals
 Dean Wareham – guitar, vocals
 Bill Wells – piano, arrangement
 Sarah Ward – flute
 Isobel Campbell – cello
 Dawn Kelly – French horn
 Gregor Reid – percussion

References

External links
 

1997 albums
The Pastels albums
Domino Recording Company albums